Bob McDonnell served as Governor of Virginia from January 16, 2010, to January 11, 2014.  Before serving as governor, McDonnell served as  Virginia Attorney General from 2006 to 2010 and in the Virginia House of Delegates from 1992 to 2006.

References

Political history of Virginia